Beutler (German for sacker, bagger or bag maker) is a surname. Notable people with the surname include:

Andreas Beutler (born 1963), ice hockey player
Annette Beutler (born 1976), Swiss cyclist
August Frederik Beutler (c. 1728), ensign in the employ of the Dutch East India Company
Betsy Beutler, American actress
Bruce Beutler (born 1957), American immunologist and geneticist
Chris Beutler (born 1944), Nebraska state senator, 1978–1986 and 1990–2006
Ernest Beutler (1928–2008), German hematologist and biomedical scientist
Heinz Beutler, Swiss curler
Jaime Herrera Beutler (born 1978), U.S. Representative from Washington
Larry E. Beutler (born 1941), clinical psychologist
Rolf Beutler (born 1940), Swiss sport shooter

See also 
 Beutler test, also known as the fluorescent spot test, a screening test used to identify enzyme defects

German-language surnames